is a railway station on the Iida Line in the town of Takamori, Shimoina District, Nagano Prefecture, Japan operated by Central Japan Railway Company (JR Central).

Lines
Shimo-Ichida Station is served by the Iida Line and is 135.6 kilometers from the starting point of the line at Toyohashi Station.

Station layout
The station consists of a single ground-level side platform serving one bi-directional track. The station is unattended. There is no station building, but only a waiting room built onto the platform.

Adjacent stations

History
Shimo-Ichida Station opened on 18 March 1923. With the privatization of Japanese National Railways (JNR) on 1 April 1987, the station came under the control of JR Central. A new station building was completed in February 2009.

Passenger statistics
In fiscal 2016, the station was used by an average of 62 passengers daily (boarding passengers only).

Surrounding area

See also
 List of railway stations in Japan

References

External links

 Shimo-Ichida Station information 

Railway stations in Nagano Prefecture
Railway stations in Japan opened in 1923
Stations of Central Japan Railway Company
Iida Line
Takamori, Nagano